Sobolevo is a rural locality (a village) and the administrative center of Soshnevskoye Rural Settlement, Ustyuzhensky District, Vologda Oblast, Russia. The population was 348 as of 2002. There are 6 streets.

Geography 
Timofeyevskoye is the nearest rural locality.

References 

Rural localities in Ustyuzhensky District